The Law Rustlers is a 1923 American silent Western film directed by Louis King and starring William Fairbanks, Edmund Cobb and Joseph W. Girard.

Synopsis
Two ranch hands set off for Alaska but stop in a town on the way, controlled by a criminal element.

Cast
 William Fairbanks as Phil Stanley
 Edmund Cobb as Harry Hartley
 Joseph W. Girard as Sol Vane 
 Ena Gregory as Glory Sillman
 Ashton Dearholt as Eph Sillman
 Wilbur McGaugh as John Cale
 Claude Payton as Doc Jordan
 Mark Hamilton as Preacher Cobb

References

Bibliography
 Munden, Kenneth White. The American Film Institute Catalog of Motion Pictures Produced in the United States, Part 1. University of California Press, 1997.

External links
 

1923 films
1923 Western (genre) films
Silent American Western (genre) films
Films directed by Louis King
American silent feature films
American black-and-white films
Arrow Film Corporation films
1920s English-language films
1920s American films